Josef Šulc (12 September 1907 – 10 July 1977) was a Czech long-distance runner. He competed in the marathon at the 1936 Summer Olympics.

References

1907 births
1977 deaths
Athletes (track and field) at the 1936 Summer Olympics
Czech male long-distance runners
Czech male marathon runners
Olympic athletes of Czechoslovakia